Ubiquitin carboxyl-terminal hydrolase 51 is an enzyme that in humans is encoded by the USP51 gene.

References

Further reading